The 2022–23 season is Anadolu Efes's 43rd season in the existence of the club. The team plays in the Basketball Super League and in the EuroLeague.

Players

Squad information

Depth chart

On loan
The following players have been on loan during the 2022–23 season and have professional contracts signed with the club.

Transactions

In

|}

Out

|}

Competitions

Overview

Presidential Cup

Matches

Basketball Super League

League table

Results summary

Results by round

Matches

Note: All times are TRT (UTC+3) as listed by the Turkish Basketball Federation.

EuroLeague

League table

Results summary

Results by round

Matches
Note: All times are CET (UTC+1) as listed by EuroLeague.

Turkish Basketball Cup

Quarterfinals

References

2022–23 EuroLeague by club
Anadolu Efes S.K. seasons
2022–23 in Turkish basketball by club